Woyo Coulibaly (born 26 May 1999) is a French professional footballer who plays as a full-back for Serie B club Parma.

Professional career
On 19 June 2019, Coulibaly signed his first professional contract with Le Havre AC. Coulibaly made his professional debut for Le Havre in a 1-1 Ligue 1 tie with Chamois Niortais on 2 August 2019.

On 30 August 2021, he joined Parma.

Personal life
Born in France, Coulibaly is of Malian descent.

References

External links
 
 
 HAC Profile

1999 births
Living people
People from Gonesse
French footballers
French sportspeople of Malian descent
Association football fullbacks
Le Havre AC players
Parma Calcio 1913 players
Ligue 2 players
Championnat National 2 players
Expatriate footballers in Italy
Footballers from Val-d'Oise